Gamasellus cophinus is a species of mite in the family Ologamasidae.

References

cophinus
Articles created by Qbugbot
Animals described in 1973